Michael Anthony Plumb (born 19 July 1954) is a retired rower from the United States.

Plumb was born in 1954 in Syracuse, New York, United States. He is a member of Vesper Boat Club in Philadelphia, Pennsylvania. He represented the United States at the 1976 Summer Olympics in the coxed four event.

References

1954 births
Living people
American male rowers
Rowers at the 1976 Summer Olympics
Olympic rowers of the United States
Sportspeople from Syracuse, New York